Rashid Mubarak (Arabic:راشد مبارك) (born 8 March 1999) is an Emirati footballer. He currently plays as a forward for Al-Nasr.

Career
Rashid Mubarak started his career at Hatta and is a product of the Hatta's youth system. On 26 January 2018, Rashid Mubarak made his professional debut for Hatta against Al Dhafra in the Pro League, replacing Hamdan Qassem . landed with Hatta from the UAE Pro League to the UAE First Division League in 2017-18 season. ended up with Hatta from the UAE First Division League to the UAE Pro League in the 2017-18 season.

References

External links
 

1999 births
Living people
Emirati footballers
Hatta Club players
Al-Nasr SC (Dubai) players
UAE Pro League players
UAE First Division League players
Association football forwards
Place of birth missing (living people)